Omoglymmius bucculatus is a species of beetle in the subfamily Rhysodidae. It was described by Arrow in 1901.

References

bucculatus
Beetles described in 1901